The Mixed team competition at the 2022 World Judo Championships was held on 13 October 2022.

Results

Bracket

Repechage

First round

Uzbekistan vs Austria

Round of 16

France vs Georgia

China vs IJF Refugee Team

Brazil vs South Korea

Uzbekistan vs Israel

Japan vs Dominican Republic

Netherlands vs Kazakhstan

Germany vs Mongolia

Ukraine vs Cuba

Quarter-finals

France vs China

South Korea vs Israel

Japan vs Netherlands

Germany vs Ukraine

Semifinals

France vs Israel

Japan vs Germany

Repechage

China vs South Korea

Netherlands vs Ukraine

Third place

China vs Germany

Netherlands vs Israel

Final

Prize money
The sums listed bring the total prizes awarded to 200,000€ for the event.

References

External links
 

Team
World Mixed Team Judo Championships
World 2022